Thomas Hanna (1841 – April 13, 1901) was a politician from the U.S. state of Indiana. Between 1881 and 1885 he served as Lieutenant Governor of Indiana.

Life
Thomas Hanna was born in Avoca, Lawrence County in Indiana. There is not much information available about his youth and education. He studied law and was admitted to the bar. Afterwards he practiced law. He joined the Republican Party and in 1880 he was elected to the office of the Lieutenant Governor of Indiana. In this function he was the deputy to Governor Albert G. Porter and he presided over the Indiana Senate. After the end of his term he continued his work as a lawyer. For two years he was a special attorney at the United States Court of Claims. Thomas Hanna died on 13. April 1901 in Indianapolis.

External links
 The Political Graveyard
 Hanna at Rootweb
 Obituary at the New York Times

1841 births
1901 deaths
Lieutenant Governors of Indiana
Indiana Republicans